Gorgoni is a surname. Notable people with the surname include:

Adam Gorgoni (born 1963), American composer 
Al Gorgoni (born 1939), American guitarist, composer, arranger, and producer
Gaetano Gorgoni (1933–2020), Italian politician
Gianfranco Gorgoni (1941–2019), Italian photographer